The 1995 French motorcycle Grand Prix was the eighth round of the 1995 Grand Prix motorcycle racing season. It took place on 9 July 1995 at the Bugatti Circuit located in Le Mans, France.

500 cc classification

250 cc classification

125 cc classification

References

French motorcycle Grand Prix
French
Motorcycle Grand Prix